Kalle Multanen is a Finnish professional footballer who currently plays for Finnish club VPS.

Career

KTP
On 2 January 2019, Multanen signed with KTP on a one-year deal with an option to extend it with further one year.

Giorgione
Italian club, A.S.D. Giorgione Calcio 2000, announced on 14 August 2019, that 30-year old Multanen had joined the club.

References

External links
Guardian Football

1989 births
Living people
Finnish footballers
Finnish expatriate footballers
FC Haka players
Porin Palloilijat players
FC Ilves players
FC Lahti players
FC Kuusysi players
Kokkolan Palloveikot players
Kotkan Työväen Palloilijat players
Veikkausliiga players
Ykkönen players
Kakkonen players
Association football forwards
Finnish expatriate sportspeople in Italy
Expatriate footballers in Italy
People from Viiala
Sportspeople from Pirkanmaa